Vintage is a process or quality in wine-making.

Vintage may also refer to:

Design
 Vintage (design), a term describing manmade objects representative of or dating from an earlier period

Places
Vintage, Pennsylvania, an unincorporated community in the United States

In businesses and organizations
 Vintage Books, an American book publisher, an imprint of the Random House Group
 Vintage FM, a radio station in Penrith, New South Wales, Australia
 Vintage High School, Napa, California, U.S.

In entertainment

Music
 Vintage dance, authentic recreation of historical dance styles
 "Vintage", a song by Allie X from the album CollXtion II

Artists
 Vintage (band), a Russian pop band

Albums
 Vintage (Canned Heat album), 1970
 Vintage (East West album), 2003
 Vintage (Michael Bolton album), 2003
 Vintage (Toshiko Akiyoshi and Lew Tabackin album), 2008
 Vintage: The Very Best of Moby Grape, a 1993 album

Other
 The Vintage, a 1957 American crime drama film
 Vintage, a "Magic: The Gathering" card game tournament format sanctioned by the DCI

See also 
 
 Antique, a manmade object that is at least 100 years old
 Retro style, an outdated style that has returned to fashion / new clothing that is vintage-inspired
 Vintage clothing, garments originating from a previous era
 Vintage car, an old automobile
 Vintage Life, women's fashion and lifestyle magazine